The Sunny South, or the Whirlwind of Fate is a 1915 Australian silent film directed by Alfred Rolfe based on the popular play The Sunny South by George Darrell. It is considered a lost film.

Cast
Charles Villiers

Characters
Matt Morley/Morley Chester
Worthy Chester
Clarice Chester
Ivo Chester
Bertha/Bubs Berkley
Plantageant Smiffers
Rebecca Hann
Eli Grup
Perfidy Pounce
Ben Brewer
Dick Duggan
Black Steve
Sergeant Swoop
Monte Jack
Jinks
Bank Teller True

Play

Darrell's play premiered in 1883 and was a massive success. Darrell himself performed in it over 1,500 times. It was one of a series of melodramas Darrell wrote in his career.

Plot
In an English country mansion lives Worthy Chester, his daughter Clarice and nephew Ivo Carew. Worthy Chester is in debt to a money lender, Eli Grup, who threatens Chester with ruin unless Clarice marries him. Clarice and Ivo are in love with each other but neither has any money.

An old friend of the family, Matt Morley, returns from Australia. He reveals himself to be Morley Chester, the long supposed dead son and heir to the late owner of the estate, and claims ownership of the property.

A telegram arrives from Bubs Berkely, Morley's adopted daughter, indicating the discovery of gold in Australia. Morley and Bubs sail for Australia to find gold to save the family property; Clarice and Ivo Carew come with them.

Morley's friend Ben Brewer discovers a £5,000 gold nugget on Morley's El Dorado claim. It is placed in a local bank stood up by Dick Duggan, bushranger. Duggan is defeated in a massive fight and the nugget is recovered. Duggan is jailed, but escaped.

Perfidy Pounce, a lawyer who works for Eli Grup and has come to Australia upon his employer's wishes, arranges for Duggan to kill Morley, but later has a change of heart and betrays Duggan and Grup to Morley and company. Duggan kidnaps Bubs and imprisons her in a hut. He then captures Morley who has come to rescue her and ties him to a tree. He threatens to use Morley as a target for pistol practice unless Morley gives him a thousand pounds (£1,000) and Bubs marries him. Both refuse.

The police attack the gang in their hideout. The hut is burned down and Morley and Bobs are rescued but Duggan and his men escape.

Duggan and his gang plan to hold up the Zig Zag Railway train on the Blue Mountains. It is carrying Morley, Bubs, their friends and the gold to Sydney. However the bushrangers are defeated. Bubs marries (her adoptive father) Morley and Clarice and Ivo are also married.

Production
The film was the second Rolfe directed for the Fraser Film Release and Photographic Company. Rolfe had appeared in several of Darrell's plays as an actor.

According to the Referee "the cast was chosen from some of the most popular thespians in Australia. No expense was spared in producing both the comedy and drama on a scale comparing favorably with American offerings."

The film was shot on location at Frenchs Forest in late 1914.

A riot scene was shot at Manly Beach, involving a large number of extras carrying firearms and other weapons. According to star Charles Villiers:
All went well for a few moments, and then a military patrol swooped down and held up the show. Expostulations were useless. We were evidently up to some mischief, and the military men were determined to stop it. Perhaps they thought we were, a party of Germans having our morning strafe. So we were all duly lined up against a nearby fence while some soldiers set about disarming us. A closer view of the weapons, however, satisfied the officer in charge that we were harmless, and the 'riot' came off without further interruption.
On 10 January 1915 it was announced the film was "just completed".

Release
The movie was released with two supporting films from Fraser, We'll Take her Children in amongst our own (1915, directed by Raymond Longford), and The Unknown (1915, directed by J. E. Mathews).

Contemporary advertising for the film stated that:
A feature of the picture is the restraint exhibited by the author in dealing with the most exciting series of incidents, the Australian characteristics having been sustained throughout and the interest preserved without resource to the lurid sensationalism which is the mark of many imported films.

Legacy
The play was revived in 1980 by the Sydney Theatre Company in a production directed by Richard Wherrett with music by Terence Clarke. It was the first production at the STC.

References

External links
 
 
 
 

1915 films
Australian black-and-white films
Australian silent short films
Lost Australian films
Films directed by Alfred Rolfe
Australian films based on plays
1883 plays
Australian plays